Geritola zelica is a butterfly in the family Lycaenidae. It is found in Cameroon and Uganda.

References

Butterflies described in 1890
Poritiinae
Butterflies of Africa